Peter or Pete Spencer may refer to:

Peter Spencer (religious leader) (1782–1843), American Christian leader
Peter Spencer (journalist) (active 1970s onwards), British television news journalist
Peter Spencer (Royal Navy officer) (born 1947), British naval officer and Chief of Defence Procurement
Peter Spencer (footballer) (born 1956), Australian rules footballer
Peter Spencer (farmer) (born c. 1948), Australian farmer and political activist
Peter Bernardo Spencer, lynching victim
Pete Spencer (born 1948), British musician in the British band Smokie

Fictional characters
Peter Spencer, character in the 2020 film The Grudge

See also
List of people with surname Spencer